Adam James Hickey (born 1 March 1997) is an English cricketer. He made his first-class debut on 26 June 2016 for Durham against a touring Sri Lanka A side. He made his Twenty20 debut for Durham against Lancashire in the 2017 NatWest t20 Blast on 7 July 2017.

References

External links
 

1997 births
Living people
English cricketers
Durham cricketers
Northumberland cricketers
Sportspeople from Darlington
Cricketers from County Durham
English cricketers of the 21st century